The Korea Carbon Capture & Sequestration R&D Center (KCRC) is an institution in Daejeon, South Korea, specialized in Carbon Capture & Sequestration (CCS) R&D. The Korean government has selected CCS technology as part of core technologies for green growth, and has established the National Comprehensive Plan for CCS to commercialize and ensure the international competitiveness of CCS technology by 2020. As part of the plan, the Ministry of Science, ICT and future Planning (MSIP) has developed the ‘Korea CCS 2020 Project' to secure the best original technology of CCS and established KCRC on December 22, 2011.

Vision 
The vision of KCRC is to build a research basis and develop innovative original CCS technology by integrating Korea's CCS research capabilities.

Carbon Capture and Sequestration (CCS) 
Carbon Capture and Sequestration (CCS) is a technology to capture the large quantities of carbon dioxide normally released into the atmosphere from the use of fossil fuel in power generation and other industries, transport the captured/compressed  to a location for permanent storage site, and inject it into deep underground geologic formations to securely store it or convert it into useful materials.

Korea CCS 2020 Project 
Goal
 To secure original CCS technology to economically capture  from large final emitters
Overview
 Periods : November 1, 2011 ~ May 31, 2020 (Approximately 9 years)
 Budgets : 172.7 billion KRW
 Supported Subcontract Projects (as of 2013) : 42 Industry-University-Institute including Korea Institute of Energy Research, Korea Research Institute of Chemical Technology, Korea Institute of Science & Technology, Seoul National University, Korea University, Yonsei University, Korea Advanced Institute of Science and Technology, University of Texas, and University of California
 Participants : 600 researchers with master's and doctoral degrees

Major Roles 
Implement Korea CCS 2020 Project
 Develop innovative original CCS technology
 Secure more than 4 types of 3rd generation original  capture technology
 Demonstrate Korea's first integration technology for 10,000 tons of  capture-transport-storage and secure core technology
 Develop more than 2 original technologies for  conversion applicable to large final emitters
Build CCS Infrastructure
 Think Tank for CCS Technology Policy
 Develop R&D policy and research planning
 Establish R&D portfolio
 Promote CCS public acceptance
 Improve CCS legal system
 Build a network through international cooperation in the field of CCS
 R&D planning and outcome management
 Plan R&D through moving targets
 Promote commercialization through core technology spin-off and technology transfer
 Disseminate outcomes by operating IPR Trust System
 Information Exchange Platform for CCS Technology
 Develop and operate professional CCS education & training programs
 Provide information on the analysis of CCS R&D and policy trends of Korea and other countries
 Integrate research capabilities by holding Annual Korea CCS Conference

References

Links 
 KCRC Webpage
 Korea CCS Conference Webpage
 What is CCS
Korea CCS 2020 Project

Carbon capture and storage